The Ministry of Health (Māori: Manatū Hauora) is the public service department of New Zealand responsible for  healthcare in New Zealand. It came into existence in its current form in 1993.

History

Origins
The Ministry of Health's origins can be traced back to the Department of Public Health, which was first established in 1901 at the advice of the Central Board of Health. The Department of Public Health assumed responsibility for the provision of Māori health services between 1906 and 1909, when Māori medical health services were returned to the-then Department of Native Affairs. In 1910, the Public Health Department resumed responsibility for the control of Māori health. In 1911, a Māori Nursing Service was established as part of the Department of Public Health.

Growing strains
Its structure remained relatively static even when the Social Security Act 1938 was passed where the New Zealand government took a larger role in health purchasing. The department remained actively involved in policy (as opposed to purchasing).

By the 1970s problems had appeared in the health system. The high growth rate in hospital expenditure was occurring at a time when the economy was slowing down. Thus, the government was unable to sustain funding this growth. This led the health system to undergo a series of changes over a 20-year period from the 1980s.

Fourth National Government, 1990–1999
During the 1990s the Fourth National Government attempted to stream-line the system in a series of reforms such as separating the government purchasing and provision of health care services. Four regional health authorities (RHAs) were created to oversee the purchasing of health services while general practitioners, specialists, and hospitals were tasked with delivering health services. Public services were also turned into quasi-commercial Crown health enterprises (CHEs). In 1993, the Department was renamed as the Ministry of Health.

Fifth Labour Government, 1999–2008
The Labour–Alliance coalition government redefined the role of the Ministry of Health as part of Labour's election promises in the 1999 election.

In December 1999, the separate government health service purchasing entity, the Health Funding Authority, was merged with the Ministry of Health. Critics were anxious as to how the Ministry would perform as a funder, as they commented that the Ministry had in the past only performed as a policy organisation. However, supporters of this move stated that they believed this would make these agencies more accountable.

In February 2001, the Fifth Labour Government also launched the "New Zealand Primary Health Care Strategy" (PHCS) with the goal of improving public access to primary health care and reducing health inequalities. By 2008, the Primary Health Care Strategy had succeeded in reducing fees for doctors' and nurses' visits in "higher need areas" and for patients aged over 65 years. In addition, consultation rates increased across all age, socio-economic, and ethnic groups in New Zealand.

As part of the PHCS programme, the  Government encouraged the development of Primary Health Organisations (PHOs) to provide some primary health care services at the local level and to transition health care services from fee-for-service arrangements to capitation funding for health professionals who are members of these organisations. By early April 2003, 34 PHOs had been established throughout New Zealand.

In addition, the Fifth Labour Government established District health board (DHBs) in 2001 as subsidiary organisations of the Health Ministry. They were responsible for providing and funding health services within a defined geographical area. At the time of their dissolution in July 2022, there were twenty DHBs. They were also responsible for running hospitals and funding some health provisions in their respective areas. Funding for these DHBs was allocated according to the Ministry's population-based funding formula.

Sixth Labour Government, 2017–present
In April 2021, the Sixth Labour Government announced that DHB system would be abolished and replaced by three new entities: a centralised agency called Health New Zealand, a Māori Health Authority (MHA) to fund Māori health services, and a Public Health Agency to centralise public health work.

In October 2021, the Government introduced a parliamentary bill called the Pae Ora (Healthy Futures) Bill, which created the new public health entities and strengthened the Health Ministry's stewardship role. This bill passed into law on 7 June 2022. On 1 July, the Pae Ora (Health Futures) Act came into effect; with Health New Zealand, the MHA, and the Health Ministry's Public Health Agency assuming the district health boards' former provision of healthcare services.

Structure 
So-called "business units" of the Ministry include:
 Evidence Research and Innovation directorate
 Strategy Policy and Legislation directorate
 Māori Health directorate
 Public Health Agency
 Regulatory Services directorate
 System Performance & Monitoring directorate
 Government & Executive Services directorate
 Corporate Services directorate 
 Chief Clinical Officers
 Chief Nurse
Chief Medical Officer 
 Chief Allied Health Professions Officer

Others
Medsafe carries out medical regulatory functions within the Ministry.

The former National Health Board (NHB), which was set up in November 2009, dealt with issues such as rising costs, increased demand, an aging population and shortages of staff with a view to improving the quality, safety and sustainability of health care.

Health New Zealand exists as a separate Crown agent while the Māori Health Authority exists as an independent statutory entity.

Ministers

The Ministry serves 1 portfolio and 4 ministers.

References

Further reading

External links
  of the Ministry of Health

Health, Ministry of
Medical and health organisations based in New Zealand
New Zealand
Ministries established in 1903
1903 establishments in New Zealand